UPPA may refer to:

 University of Pau and Pays de l'Adour, in south-western France
 United People's Party of Assam, political party in Indian state of Assam

Uppa may refer to:
 Alternate name for Hoopa, California
 Taina Uppa (born 1976), Finnish javelin thrower